A Brother's Kiss is a 1997 American independent drama film written and directed by Seth Zvi Rosenfeld and starring Nick Chinlund and Michael Raynor.  It is based on the 1988 play by Rosenfeld.  It is also Rosenfeld's directorial debut. A Brother's Kiss was based on a play by writer/director Seth Zvi Rosenfeld, who grew up in the same neighborhood as actor Michael Raynor; Raynor and Nick Chinlund were also friends as children.

Plot
Mick (Michael Raynor) and Lex (Nick Chinlund) are a pair of brothers who grew up in Harlem under circumstances that were difficult at best. Their mother Doreen (Cathy Moriarty) was a diabetic with a drinking problem and difficulty in saying no to men. While she wasn't a sex worker, she grew dependent on the little gifts her lovers would bring by, and as kids, Mick and Lex learned to accept this as the way things were. One night, Mick and Lex were taking a walk in the park when they were accosted by a cop who molested the younger Mick. Lex, older and strong as a grown man, attacked the cop, which led to a stay in a reform school. Years later, Mick is himself a policeman; while he's tried to bury the childhood incident in his past, he still shows emotional scars and is sexually dysfunctional. Lex, however, has taken the more dramatic slide. Since his stay in reform school, Lex has been in and out of trouble; today he has a combative relationship with Debbie (Rosie Perez), his girlfriend and the mother of his child, and a going-nowhere job driving a bus. He also sells drugs for local dealer Lefty Louie (John Leguizamo), but has developed enough of a habit that his sales don't begin to compensate for the amount he uses himself. Mick tries to look out for his big brother, but it might be too late to save him.

Cast
Nick Chinlund as Lex
Michael Raynor as Mick
Justin Pierce as Young Lex
Joshua Danowsky as Young Mick
John Leguizamo as Lefty
Cathy Moriarty as Doreen
Rosie Perez as Debbie
Michael Rapaport as Stingy
Marisa Tomei as Missy
Talent Harris as Vic

Reception
The film has a 100% rating on Rotten Tomatoes.  Roger Ebert gave the film three stars.  John Petrakis of the Chicago Tribune also gave it three stars.  Owen Gleiberman of Entertainment Weekly graded it a B−.

References

External links
 
 

1997 films
American drama films
American independent films
American films based on plays
1997 directorial debut films
1990s English-language films
1990s American films